Chamber Music America (CMA) is an American non-profit organization that provides small ensemble professionals with access to a variety of professional development, networking, and funding resources. CMA's regular initiatives include grants, awards, and commissioning programs for ensembles and presenters, a national conference held annually in New York City, and the publication of Chamber Music magazine. CMA-members organizations and individuals include ensembles, musicians, concert presenters, artist managers, composers, educators, and others involved in the performance of classical, jazz, contemporary, and world music.

In May 2012, Chamber Music America introduced National Chamber Music Month, a month-long initiative to raise awareness of small ensemble performance in the United States.

History 

Chamber Music America was founded in 1977 by 34 musicians with the principal aims of uniting, serving, and advocating for small ensemble music professionals. After first initiating a series of residencies designed to bring small ensemble performance into new, community-oriented venues, CMA was chosen by the National Endowment for the Arts to administer NEA's first chamber music grant program.

The first Chamber Music America National Conference was held in 1978, and membership was extended to presenters, artist managers, publicists, and music-related businesses shortly thereafter. In the early 1980s, CMA began its first commissioning series. Among the first pieces commissioned with CMA-support were works by Martin Bresnick, Ellen Taaffe Zwilich, and Charles Wuorinen. Aaron Jay Kernis's String Quartet No. 2—commissioned by the Lark Quartet with CMA support—won the Pulitzer Prize in 1997. The current Classical Commissioning program is supported by the Andrew W. Mellon Foundation.

Since 2000, jazz has been a significant part of Chamber Music America's grants and professional development programs. CMA's two jazz-specific grant programs—New Jazz Works: Commissioning and Ensemble Development and Presenter Consortium for Jazz—are supported by the Doris Duke Charitable Foundation.

CMA defines chamber music as "music composed for small ensembles, with one musician per part, generally performed without a conductor. The term once referred only to Western classical music for small ensembles, such as string quartets. But today chamber music encompasses myriad forms, including contemporary and traditional jazz, classical, and world genres."

In September 2021, the organization appointed Kevin Kwan Loucks as its chief executive officer. He succeeded Margaret Lioi who previously held the position for 21 years.

National Chamber Music Month 

In 2012, Chamber Music America introduced the first National Chamber Music Month (NCMM). According to Chamber Music America, the goals of NCMM are to "raise public awareness of the chamber music field nationally and to help ensembles and presenters attract new audiences and media attention within their own communities." National Chamber Music Month is held in May.

References 

Music organizations based in the United States
Arts organizations established in 1977
1977 establishments in the United States